The Nemzeti Bajnokság I/B is the second tier league for Hungarian women's handball clubs. It is administered by the Hungarian Handball Federation. The league is divided into two groups, a Western one and an Eastern one. Fourteen teams compete in each group and the group winners gain automatic promotion to the NB I.

Teams 
The following teams participate in the 2018–19 season:

References 
 The history and statistics of the Hungarian Leagues

External links 
 Official Site of the Hungarian Handball Association
 Statistics and IT help for Hungarian Leagues

Handball leagues in Hungary
Women's handball leagues
Women's handball in Hungary
Women's sports leagues in Hungary